12482 Pajka, provisional designation , is a background asteroid from the inner regions of the asteroid belt, approximately 4.3 kilometers in diameter. It was discovered by Slovak astronomers Adrián Galád and Alexander Pravda at Modra Observatory on 23 March 1997. It was named after Paula Pravdová ("Pajka"), the daughter of the second discoverer.

Orbit and classification 

Pajka is a non-family asteroid from the main belt's background population. It orbits the Sun in the inner asteroid belt at a distance of 2.0–2.8 AU once every 3 years and 9 months (1,372 days). Its orbit has an eccentricity of 0.16 and an inclination of 9° with respect to the ecliptic.

The body's observation arc begins 6 years prior to its official discovery observation, with a precovery taken at Steward Observatory (Kitt Peak–Spacewatch) in October 1991.

Naming 

This minor planet was named after Paula Pravdová (born 1990), whose familiar name is "Pajka". She is the daughter of the discovering astronomer Alexander Pravda and often visited Modra Observatory. The official naming citation was published by the Minor Planet Center on 28 March 2002.

Physical characteristics 

A rotational lightcurve of Pajka was obtained from photometric observations made by the discovering astronomer at Modra Observatory in January 2008. The lightcurve showed a rotation period of  hours with a brightness amplitude of 0.21 in magnitude. The Collaborative Asteroid Lightcurve Link assumes a standard albedo for stony asteroids of 0.20 and calculates a diameter of 4.3 kilometers with an absolute magnitude of 14.2.

References

External links 
 (12482) Pajka at AstDyS, University of Pisa
 Asteroid Lightcurve Database (LCDB), query form (info )
 Dictionary of Minor Planet Names, Google books
 Asteroids and comets rotation curves, CdR – Observatoire de Genève, Raoul Behrend
 Discovery Circumstances: Numbered Minor Planets (10001)-(15000) – Minor Planet Center
 
 

012482
Discoveries by Adrián Galád
Discoveries by Alexander Pravda
Pajka
19970323